Dichromodes ida is a moth of the family Geometridae. It is endemic to New Zealand.

References

Oenochrominae
Moths described in 1905
Moths of New Zealand
Endemic fauna of New Zealand
Taxa named by George Hudson
Endemic moths of New Zealand